Glad to Get Away is the 24th album by Jandek, and was released (1994) as Corwood Industries #0762. It continues the acoustic sound of the prior two albums.

Track listing

Album cover description 
Seth Tisue, on his coverage of Jandek discography, stated that the cover was "Almost identical to Graven Image. It looks like he stepped about ten feet to one side—you're looking down the driveway along the side of the house, instead of just at the back of the house—and took another photo."

Part of this album cover would be incorporated into both the trailer and the DVD cover of the documentary Jandek on Corwood.

Reviews

References

External links
Seth Tisue's Glad to Get Away review

Jandek albums
Corwood Industries albums
1994 albums